Avon Grove High School is a public high school located in Southern Chester County, Pennsylvania, United States. It is part of the Avon Grove School District.

Avon Grove High School enrolls about ~1,826 students in grades 9-12. 

The school was established in 1928 with Pierre S. du Pont being involved in designing its first building. A newer building was built in 1957, and renovated in the 90's. Currently being renovated again with plans to become the new Avon Grove School District Middle School

New Building 
In June 2020, construction started on a brand new campus for Avon Grove High School as class occupancy exceeded fifty percent over its maximum. By September 2022, the campus located in Jennersville, Pennsylvania was functional enough to allow for the 2022-23 school year. The estimated cost of the new campus is projected to be $211,849,264.

Notable alumni 
Joey Wendle, baseball player
 Toby Leaman, singer, bassist of American rock group Dr. Dog
 Scott McMicken, singer, guitarist of American rock group Dr. Dog
 Dan Torelli, former drummer of American rock group Medina Lake

References

External links
 

Public high schools in Pennsylvania
1928 establishments in Pennsylvania
Educational institutions established in 1928
School buildings completed in 1957
School buildings completed in 2022
Schools in Chester County, Pennsylvania